Emily Cheng (born 1953) is an American artist of Chinese ancestry. She is best known for large scale paintings with a center focus often employing expansive circular images... "radiantly colored, radially composed". She has won numerous awards including Pollock-Krasner Foundation Fellowship, 2010, New York Foundation for the Arts Fellowship, 1996, Yaddo Residency, 1995, National Endowment for the Arts Fellowship, 1982–1983.

Cheng received her BFA in 1975 from the Rhode Island School of Design and attended the New York Studio School. Cheng has exhibited widely in the US and in Asia. In 2011, Cheng created Charting Sacred Territories, an exhibition exploring world religions which opened in the Museum of Contemporary Art Taipei, Taiwan (2011) and traveled to Hanart TZ Gallery in (2015), Shenzhen Art Museum, Shenzhen, China, (2015) and in Europe at the Palais Liechtenstein Feldkirch, Austria (2019).

Cheng has had numerous solo shows in the US and in Asia and is represented by Hanart TZ Gallery in Hong Kong.

In 2007, Timezone 8 published a monograph of Emily Cheng titled, Chasing Clouds, a decade of studies, with essays by Kevin Powers and Johnson Chang

Emily Cheng has lived and worked in New York City since 1977 and teaches Asian Art History at the School of Visual Arts

Selected solo exhibitions 
 Ille Arts, Amagansett, New York, (2017, 2014)
 Shenzhen Art Museum, Shenzhen, China, (2015)
 Hanart T.Z. Gallery, Hong Kong, (2015, 2011, 1996)
 Zane Bennett Contemporary, Santa Fe, New Mexico, (2013)
 Museum of Contemporary Art Taipei, Taiwan (2011)
 Louis Vuitton Maison, Kowloon, Hong Kong, (2010)
 Ayala Museum Makati, Philippines, (2006)
 Plum Blossom Gallery, New York, NY, (2004)
 Schmidt/Dean Gallery, Philadelphia, PA (2002, 1992, 1990)
 Byron Cohen Gallery, Kansas City, MO (2001)
 Metropolitan Museum of Manila, Philippines (1997)
 John Post Lee Gallery, New York, NY, Projects Room (1997)
 Contemporary Arts Center, Cincinnati, Ohio, 1994
 David Beitzel Gallery, New York, NY, (1992)
 Lang & O'Hara Gallery, New York, NY, (1990, 1988, 1987)
 The Bronx Museum of the Arts, Bronx, NY, (1989)
 White Columns, New York, NY, (1985)

Selected group exhibitions 
 Art Basel Hong Kong, (Hanart Gallery), Hong Kong, 2017
 China Institute, New York, NY, 2014
 Beijing Art Fair, Beijing, China, 2013
 Museum of Chinese in America New York, NY, 2010
 Kidspace, MASS MoCA, Williamstown, MA, 2010, 2005
 Museum of Contemporary Art, Shanghai, China, 2009
 Guangzhou Triennial, Guangdong, China, 2009
 Museum of Art, Guangzhou, China, 2008
 Contrast Gallery, Shanghai and Beijing, China, 2008
 University of South Florida Contemporary Art Museum, Tampa, Florida, 2006
 Hong Kong Arts Centre, Hong Kong, 2004
 American Academy of Art, New York, New York, 2004
 Longmarch Project, Beijing, China, 2002
 Sotheby’s, New York, NY, 2001
 Newhouse Center, Snug Harbor Cultural Center, Staten Island, NY, 2000
 Katonah Museum of Art, Katonah, NY, 2000
 National Academy and Museum, NY, 2000
 Municipal Museum of Gyor, Hungary, 1999
 New Museum of Contemporary Art, New York, NY, 1998
 De Cordova Museum and the Computer Museum, Boston, MA, 1994
 International Graphic Biennial, Muveszeti Museum, Hungary, 1995
 Yerba Buena Center for the Arts, San Francisco, CA, 1994
 Drawing Center, NY; traveled to Corcoran, Washington D.C., Santa Monica Museum of Art, Santa Monica CA; The Contemporary Art Museum St. Louis, St. Louis MO; American Center, Paris, France, 1993
 Cone Editions Gallery, New York 1990
 Anina Nosei Gallery, New York, 1988
 Greenville County Museum of Art, South Carolina, 1988
 North Carolina Museum of Art, North Carolina, 1988
 Hallwalls, Buffalo, NY, 1988
 Grace Borgenicht Gallery, New York, 1986
 Tibor de Nagy, New York, 1985
 Asian American Arts Centre, New York, 1985

Awards 
 Pollock-Krasner Foundation Fellowship, 2010
 New York Foundation for the Arts Fellowship, 1996
 Yaddo Residency, 1995
 National Endowment for the Arts Fellowship, 1982-1983

Bibliography 
 Books by Emily Cheng include Emily Cheng: Chasing Clouds: A Decade of Studies - Publisher: Blue Kingfisher; n edition (March 1, 2008) 
 The Figure: Another Side of Modernism – Publisher: Snug Haror Cultural Center SHCC; Et Al (2000)

References

External links 
 Website Emily Cheng 
 The Shanghai Restoration Project - BOARdom feat. artwork by Emily Cheng 
 The Works Emily Cheng at Hanart
 Emily Cheng, Chasing Clouds, Music by Shanghai Restoration Project

1953 births
Living people
American artists of Chinese descent
American contemporary painters
Artists from New York City
New York Studio School of Drawing, Painting and Sculpture alumni
Rhode Island School of Design alumni